A world premiere is the worldwide debut of a work.

World Premiere may also refer to:

 World Premiere (Partners-N-Crime album), 2001
 World Premiere (The Team album), 2006
 World Premiere (film), a 1941 film starring Frances Farmer
 World Premiere (horse), a Japanese racehorse